Utsav (Hindi: उत्सव; English: Festival) is a 1984 Hindi erotic drama film, produced by Shashi Kapoor and directed by Girish Karnad. The film is based on play Mrichakatika (The Little Clay Cart) by Śūdraka.

The film stars Shankar Nag, Shashi Kapoor, Rekha, Amjad Khan, Anuradha Patel, Shekhar Suman, Anupam Kher, Neena Gupta, Kulbhushan Kharbanda, Annu Kapoor, Sanjana Kapoor and Kunal Kapoor.

The role of Samsthanak is  played by Shashi Kapoor, who is also the producer of the movie. It was originally supposed to be played by Amitabh Bachchan. However, in July 1982, Bachchan met with a major accident in Bangalore. So the producer himself decided to step in. The film's music is by Laxmikant-Pyarelal and is noted for its songs like, 'Man Kyun Behka Re Behka Aadhi Raat Ko', a famous duet song by sisters Lata Mangeshkar and Asha Bhosle. Anuradha Paudwal's 'Mere Man Baja Mridang' for which she won the Filmfare Best Female Playback Award in 1985. Suresh Wadkar also has a song, 'Sanjh Dhale Gagan Tale'. The Central Board of Film Certification of India gave the film an "A" certificate on 23 August 1984.

Overview

The play is set in the ancient city of Ujjayini during the reign of the King Pālaka, near the end of the Pradyota dynasty that made up the first quarter of the fifth century BC.

Plot
The story is  about a courtesan, Vasantasena (Rekha), and her chance meeting with a poor Brahmin man, Charudatta (Shekhar Suman), in Ujjain.

Cast
 Shashi Kapoor as Samsthanak
 Rekha as Vasantsena
 Amjad Khan as Vatsayana, author of Kamasutra; narrator
 Shankar Nag as Sajjal, the thief
 Kulbhushan Kharbanda as Teacher of Aryak
 Shekhar Suman as Charudutt
 Neena Gupta as Madanika, courtesan slave in Vasantsena's house
 Anuradha Patel as Aditi, Charudutt's Wife
 Anupam Kher as Samsthanak's friend
 Annu Kapoor as Masseur who is trying to be an ascetic
 Sanjana Kapoor as A courtesan slave in Vasantsena's house
 Kunal Kapoor as Aryak, the revolutionary.
 Harish Patel as Maitreya, Charudutt's friend.
 Yunus Parvez as One of the gamblers, who later becomes the owner of the masseur
 Satish Kaushik as Cart driver

Production
The film was shot in Kolkebail, Karnataka in 1982–83. Producer Shashi Kapoor incurred a loss of Rs 1.5 crore after the film's release in 1984.

Soundtrack
The film's soundtrack was composed by Laxmikant-Pyarelal and the lyrics were penned by Vasant Dev.

Awards

References

External links
 
 A study of film Utsav

1984 films
1980s Hindi-language films
Films scored by Laxmikant–Pyarelal
Indian erotic drama films
Indian films based on plays
Films set in the 5th century BC
Films about courtesans in India
Films whose production designer won the Best Production Design National Film Award
1980s erotic drama films
Indian epic films
Films directed by Girish Karnad
1984 drama films